Portland is an unincorporated community and census-designated place (CDP) in Portland Township, Cerro Gordo County, Iowa, United States. As of the 2010 census it had a population of 35.

History
Portland's population in 1925 was 17.

Geography
Portland is located in northern Iowa in eastern Cerro Gordo County, along the northeast bank of the Winnebago River. The Mason City limits are a short distance to the north, with downtown Mason City  to the northwest.

Demographics

References

Census-designated places in Cerro Gordo County, Iowa
Census-designated places in Iowa